This is a list of the 25 municipalities (comuni) of the Province of Trapani, Sicily, Italy.

List

See also
List of municipalities of Italy

References

Trapani